The Alberta Open is a golf tournament that is held in Alberta, Canada. It was an important event on the Canadian Tour and its predecessors until 1999 when it endured a brief hiatus after losing its main sponsors. It returned as an event on the provincial circuit in 2002.

Although tournament organisers, Alberta Golf, state that the Alberta Open was first played in 1935, the origins of the tournament can be traced back further, with an open championship being introduced to the Alberta Golf Association provincial tournament week in around 1912.

Originally a one-day 36-hole event played during the provincial tournament week alongside the amateur championship, the Alberta Open became a separate 72-hole tournament in 1937. In response to not attracting as many big-name players as hoped, in 1953 prize money was substantially reduced and the tournament was cut to 54-holes. As the Canadian Tour established itself in the late 1980s, the Alberta Open was again extended to 72-holes in 1988. Following its revival in 2002, it has been contested over both 36 and 54 holes.

Winners

References

External links

Former PGA Tour Canada events
Golf tournaments in Alberta